Makkink is a Dutch surname that may refer to the following people:
Bruce Makkink, South African lawn bowler
Herman Makkink (1937–2013), Dutch sculptor, graphic artist and illustrator
Rianne Makkink (born 1964), Dutch architect, founder of Studio Makkink & Bey

Dutch-language surnames